Mateo Montenegro (born 28 August 1998) is an Argentine professional footballer who plays as a midfielder for Tristán Suárez, on loan from Central Córdoba.

Professional career
Mateo Montenegro started his career at Central Córdoba in Santiago del Estero, where he played in the club's youth teams. At the age of 16, he tried his luck at Vélez Sarsfield in Buenos Aires, where he did not play much until he decided to go to Independiente at the age of 17, following a special request from reserve team coach Claudio Vivas. He later moved moved to Boca Juniors, until he returned to Central Córdoba in 2019.

Montenegro made his professional debut with Central Córdoba in a 1-0 Argentine Primera División win over Colón on 25 January 2020.

In February 2022, Montenegro was loaned out to Primera Nacional club Mitre until the end of the year. Due to lack of playing time, the spell was terminated and he was instead loaned out to Tristán Suárez in June 2022 for the remainder of the year.

References

External links
 
 
 

1998 births
Living people
People from Santiago del Estero
Footballers from Rosario, Santa Fe
Argentine footballers
Association football midfielders
Central Córdoba de Santiago del Estero footballers
Club Atlético Vélez Sarsfield footballers
Club Atlético Independiente footballers
Boca Juniors footballers
Club Atlético Mitre footballers
CSyD Tristán Suárez footballers
Argentine Primera División players
Primera Nacional players